Marei Al-Moqaadi (born 12 July 1988) is a Saudi football player who plays for Muhayil as a striker.

References

External links 
 

1988 births
Living people
Saudi Arabian footballers
Al-Watani Club players
Al-Suqoor FC players
Al-Hazem F.C. players
Ettifaq FC players
Al-Kholood Club players
Al-Hejaz Club players
Muhayil Club players
Place of birth missing (living people)
Saudi First Division League players
Saudi Professional League players
Saudi Second Division players
Saudi Third Division players
Association football forwards